The Merrick-Simmons House (also known as the C.W. Lewis House) is a historic house located at 102 South 10th Street in Fernandina Beach, Florida.

Description and history 
It was added to the National Register of Historic Places on January 13, 1983.

References

External links

 Nassau County listings at National Register of Historic Places
 Florida's Office of Cultural and Historical Programs
 Nassau County listings
 Great Floridians of Fernandina Beach

Houses on the National Register of Historic Places in Florida
Houses in Nassau County, Florida
Houses completed in 1861
1861 establishments in Florida
National Register of Historic Places in Nassau County, Florida
Greek Revival houses in Florida
Fernandina Beach, Florida